USS Mystery (SP-16) was the proposed designation for an armed motorboat that never actually served in the United States Navy.

Mystery was a private motorboat built in 1916 by the Gas Engine and Power Company at Morris Heights, New York. The U.S. Navy inspected her in early 1917 for possible World War I service as a patrol boat in the 3rd Naval District and she was registered accordingly with the naval section patrol designation SP-16. However, the Navy never took possession of or commissioned Mystery, and she remained in civilian hands throughout the war.

Notes

References
 
 Department of the Navy: Naval Historical Center: Online Library of Selected Images: Civilian Ships: Mystery (Motor Boat, 1916)
 NavSource Online: Section Patrol Craft Photo Archive Mystery (SP 16)

Cancelled ships of the United States Navy
Patrol vessels of the United States Navy
World War I patrol vessels of the United States
Ships built in Morris Heights, Bronx
1916 ships